The Battle of Kars may also refer to:
 Siege of Kars (1744), part of the Ottoman–Persian War (1743–1746)
 Battle of Kars (1745), part of the Ottoman–Persian War (1743–1746)
 Battle of Kars (1828), part of the Russo-Turkish War (1828–1829)
 Battle of Kars, part of the Crimean War
 Battle of Kars, part of the Russo-Turkish War (1877–1878)
 Battle of Kars (1920), part of the Turkish–Armenian War